Victor Demba Bindia (born 6 August 1989) is a Senegalese footballer who plays for Al-Wehdat.

Career
He made his debut for Sandefjord versus Molde in the Tippeligaen in April 2009.

In July 2012, he was called into the Senegal squad for the 2012 Summer Olympics. However, he was injured in a friendly match ahead of the opening match against Great Britain, resulting in Bindia missing the whole tournament.

Bindia signed for Al-Wehdat in Jordan on 14 January 2019.

Career statistics

References

External links

1989 births
Living people
Senegalese footballers
Sandefjord Fotball players
Senegalese expatriate footballers
Expatriate footballers in Norway
Senegalese expatriate sportspeople in Norway
Eliteserien players
Norwegian First Division players
Association football defenders